Eruera Te Whiti o Rongomai Love (18 May 1905 – 12 July 1942) was a New Zealand rugby player, interpreter and military leader. Of Māori descent, he identified with the Te Ati Awa iwi.

One of seven surviving children of Wi Hapi Pakau Love and Ripeka Wharawhara Love, he was born in Waikawa Bay, Marlborough, New Zealand on 18 May 1905.

A Territorial officer, during the Second World War, he was a company commander and later battalion commander of the Māori Battalion. He was killed in action in the Western Desert on 12 July 1942.

References

1905 births
1942 deaths
20th-century translators
Interpreters
New Zealand Māori soldiers
New Zealand Māori sportspeople
New Zealand military personnel killed in World War II
New Zealand rugby union players
Te Āti Awa people